Mozhi may refer to:
Mozhi (transliteration), a system of romanisation used for Malayalam script
Mozhi (film), a 2007 Tamil film produced by Prakash Raj and directed by Radha Mohan